"U and Dat" is the second single from E-40's album My Ghetto Report Card. The song features American rapper T-Pain and American singer Kandi Burruss, and it was produced by Lil Jon. A remix was released in early August with Juelz Santana, Snoop Dogg, and Lil' Flip. It was featured on an Amp'd mobile commercial. Although it is considered a West coast hip hop song, the song's beat structure incorporates typical southern hip hop snares as well as Lil Jon's signature crunk synths and whistles. The song peaked at number 13 on the U.S. Billboard Hot 100, which remains E-40's highest-charting single as lead artist to date. The track is credited to have popularized the use of T-Pain as a hook singer on hip hop tracks. The song was certified platinum by the RIAA on March 31, 2016.

Music video
The music video is in a club scene and in a car.  Most of the video includes T-Pain and E-40 scouting various women, Kandi Burruss and Ashalee Albar being just to name a few.  Kandi's part in the video is to push off  men around her.

Lil Jon and Katt Williams make a cameo appearance in the video.

Chart performance

Weekly charts

Year-end charts

Certifications

References

2006 singles
2006 songs
E-40 songs
T-Pain songs
Kandi Burruss songs
Asylum Records singles
Music videos directed by Director X
Song recordings produced by Lil Jon
Songs written by Kandi Burruss
Songs written by T-Pain
Dirty rap songs
Crunk songs